The Hangsackgrat (2,634 m) is a mountain of the Glarus Alps, located south of Weisstannen in the canton of St. Gallen. It lies on the range east of Piz Sardona, that separates the Weisstannental from the Calfeisental.

References

External links
Hangsackgrat on Hikr

Mountains of the Alps
Mountains of Switzerland
Mountains of the canton of St. Gallen